The taxonomy of the plant family Liliaceae has had a complex history since its first description in the mid-eighteenth century. Originally, the Liliaceae were defined as having a "calix" (perianth) of six equal-coloured parts, six stamens, a single style, and a superior, three-chambered (trilocular) ovary turning into a capsule fruit at maturity. The taxonomic circumscription of the family Liliaceae progressively expanded until it became the largest plant family and also extremely diverse, being somewhat arbitrarily defined as all species of plants with six tepals and a superior ovary. It eventually came to encompass about 300 genera and 4,500 species, and was thus a "catch-all" and hence paraphyletic. Only since the more modern taxonomic systems developed by the Angiosperm Phylogeny Group (APG) and based on phylogenetic principles, has it been possible to identify the many separate taxonomic groupings within the original family and redistribute them, leaving a relatively small core as the modern family Liliaceae, with fifteen genera and 600 species.

The Liliaceae emerged from the Liliales order, separating from its sister clade around 52 million years ago (mya), and diversifying around 34 mya. Of the major clades, the Lilieae arose in Eurasia while the Medeoleae arose in North America but was subsequently dispersed, as may have the Streptopoideae and Calochortoideae. Liliaceae fossils have been dated to the Paleogene and Cretaceous eras in the Antarctic.

The Liliaceae probably arose as shade plants, with subsequent evolution to open areas including deciduous forest in the more open autumnal period. This was accompanied by a shift from rhizomes to bulbs, to more showy flowers, the production of capsular fruit and narrower parallel-veined leaves.

While the suprageneric (above genus level) structure of the family has varied greatly with its ever-changing circumscription, as currently constituted the family consists of three subfamilies: Lilioideae, Calochortoideae and Streptopoideae. Lilioideae is further divided into two tribes, Medeoleae and Lilieae. The three subfamilies contain fifteen genera and approximately 600 species in all.

History

Pre-Darwinian 
The type genus, Lilium, from which the name of the family was derived, was originally formally described by Carl Linnaeus in 1753, with seven species. He placed Lilium within the Hexandria Monogynia (six stamens, one carpel) in his sexual classification in the Species Plantarum. The family Liliaceae was first described by Michel Adanson in 1763, but formally named by Antoine Laurent de Jussieu in 1789. Adanson described eight subfamilies with 78 genera, however the subfamily he described as Lis (lilies) had seven genera (Uvularia, Mithridatium, Mendoni, Lilium, Fritillaria, Imperialis — now part of Fritillaria — and Tulipa) of which four are in the modern genus. Jussieu placed these into the ordo, Lilia in the classis, Stamina Perigyna of the Monocotyledones (monocots), with eight genera (Tulipa, Erythronioum, Methonica, Uvularia, Fritillaria, Imperialis, Lilium, Yucca) only four of which remain in the family. He defined Lilia as "calix" (perianth) of six equal coloured parts, six stamens, a superior ovary, single style, and trilocular capsule. The term ordo at that time was closer to what we now understand as family, rather than order. Although Jussieu used the Latin "lilia" in his Genera Plantarum, elsewhere he used the French "liliacées", as had Adanson. The word "Liliaceae" was soon widely used by botanists such as Samuel Frederick Gray, John Lindley, and Pierre-Joseph Redouté in the early nineteenth century.

Gray (1821) provided the first description of Jussieu's scheme in English, identifying two genera occurring in Britain (Tulipa, Fritillaria), distinguished by the absence or presence of basal nectaries. His key used the presence of six equal stamens, a single style, a simple petaloid (undifferentiated tepals resembling petals) perianth and a trilocular capsule with flat seeds to identify the family. Although Augustin De Candolle (1813) had not explicitly described the Liliaceae, his overall classification scheme influenced many later writers including Gray. In this scheme,  the Liliaceae were considered a family within those vascular plants (Vasculares) whose vascular bundles were thought to arise from within (Endogènes, endogenous), a term he preferred to Monocotylédonés. Jussieu's Monocotyledones became the Phanérogames (Phenogamae in Gray), meaning "visible seed", hence Endogenæ phanerogamæ. Candolle also instituted the concept of ordered ranks, based on classes, subclasses, familles (Latin: ordines naturales) and tribus (tribes), subdividing the Liliaceae.

Lindley was the first post-Linnaean English systematist, publishing his work in 1830, and following the reasoning of Jussieu he used the term tribe to describe the Liliaceae as a division of the hexapetaloid monocots, characterised by a superior ovary, highly developed perianth, inward turning anthers, a trilocular polyspermous capsule and seeds with a soft spongy coat. He offered seven genera as examples (Erythronium, Lilium, Calochortus, Blandfordia, Polianthes, Hemerocallis and Funkia). By 1846, in his final work, he refined and greatly expanded his taxonomy, favouring the term Alliances of Endogens over monocots as a class, of which there were eleven. Of these "alliances", the Liliales consisted of four Orders (families) including Liliaceae, which he referred to as lilyworts in the vernacular, with 133 genera and 1200 species. In this work he unhappily acknowledged the confusing array of different approaches to the classification of the Liliaceae, the lack of a clear definition, and the great diversity in the circumscription of the order, which had expanded vastly, with many subdivisions. As he saw it, the Liliaceae had already become a ("catch-all") grouping, being "everything that does not belong to the other parts of the Lilial Alliance", but expressed hope that the future would reveal some characteristic that would group them better. In other words, he foresaw that Liliaceae would come to be regarded as paraphyletic. By the time of the next major British classification, that of Bentham and Hooker in 1883 (published in Latin) several of Lindley's other families had been absorbed into the Liliaceae. This was the last major classification using the "natural" or pre-evolutionary approach to classification, based on characteristics selected a posteriori in order to group together taxa that have the greatest number of shared characteristics. This approach, also referred to as polythetic was superseded by ones based on an understanding of the acquisition of characteristics through evolution, referred to as phyletic.

Post-Darwinian 

Although Charles Darwin's Origin of Species (1859) preceded Bentham and Hooker's publication, the latter project was commenced much earlier and George Bentham was initially sceptical of Darwinism. The new phyletic approach changed the way that taxonomists considered plant classification, incorporating evolutionary information into their schemata, but this did little to further define the circumscription of Liliaceae. The major works in the late nineteenth and early twentieth century employing this approach were in the German literature, the Eichler (1875–1886), Engler and Prantl (1886–1924) and Wettstein (1901–1935) systems. These placed the Liliaceae into one of the major subdivisions of the monocotyledons, the Liliiflorae. In the English literature, Charles Bessey (1915) followed Adolf Engler in defining Liliaceae as "Pistil mostly 3-celled; stamens 6; perianth of two similar whorls, each of three similar leaves", although placing the Liliales in a novel subclass of monocots, the Strobiloideae, while from John Hutchinson (1959) onwards the Liliaceae were treated as part of the Liliales (see Table 1).

Over time the Liliaceae became increasingly broadly, and somewhat arbitrarily, defined as all species of plants with six tepals and a superior ovary. They eventually came to encompass about 300 genera and 4,500 species, within the order Liliales in the scheme of Arthur Cronquist (1981). Cronquist was a "lumper" preferring a small number of very large groupings and his classification of the Liliaceae represented the greatest expansion of the family to date. Cronquist placed most flowering petaloid monocots with six stamens in this very broad (and clearly polyphyletic) family, hence the alternative name lilioid monocots. He rejected the importance of ovary position and thus included with the Liliaceae with their superior ovary (hypogynous), the Amaryllidaceae, some species of which had an inferior ovary (epigynous), and which others separated into a distinct family. The Liliaceae were one of the major families in the Cronquist system which included 22 families in addition to Liliaceae in the more restricted sense (sensu stricto, s.s.) used by others. Later more conventional schemes include the system of Robert F. Thorne and that of Armen Takhtajan which characterised the family as petaloid monocots, characterised by showy flowers with tepals and without starch in the endosperm.

Deconstructing Liliaceae 

Other botanists in the twentieth century echoed Lindley's concerns about the lack of a clearly defined grouping for Liliaceae. The earliest of these was Johannes Paulus Lotsy (1911), building on Wettstein's work. Lotsy suggested four separate families, Liliaceae, Alliaceae, Agapanthaceae and Gilliesiaceae, within the Liliifloren. This recognised the major groupings that would later be transferred to Amaryllidaceae as subfamilies Allioideae and Agapanthoideae, with Gilliesieae as a tribe within the Allioideae. This approach was later followed by Herbert Huber in 1969. These various proposals to separate small groups of genera into more homogeneous families made little impact until Rolf Dahlgren (1985), following Huber's lead, developed a system incorporating new information, including synapomorphic characters (i.e., shared characters believed to have evolved from a common ancestor). While Cronquist was a "lumper", Dahlgren was a "splitter", preferring a larger number of more homogeneous groupings. Where Cronquist saw one family, Dahlgren saw forty distributed over three orders (predominantly Liliales and Asparagales), reducing Liliaceae to ten genera (see Table 3). Over the 1980s, in the context of a more general review of the classification of angiosperms, the Liliaceae were subjected to more intense scrutiny. By the end of that decade, the Royal Botanic Gardens at Kew, the British Museum of Natural History and the Edinburgh Botanical Gardens formed a committee to examine the possibility of separating the family into smaller taxa, at least for the purpose of organizing their herbaria. That committee finally recommended that 24 new families be created in the place of the original broad Liliaceae, largely by elevating subfamilies to the rank of separate families.

The 1990s saw considerable progress in plant phylogenetics and cladistic theory, enabling a phylogenetic tree to be constructed for the flowering plants. The establishment of major new clades necessitated a departure from the older but widely used classifications such as Cronquist and Thorne, based largely on morphology rather than genetic data. These developments complicated discussions on plant evolution and necessitated a major taxonomic restructuring. rbcL gene sequencing and cladistic analysis of monocots in 1995 had redefined the Liliales order out of four original morphological orders sensu Dahlgren. The largest clade within this redefined Liliales, christened the "core Liliales" representing a now much reduced Liliaceae, had all previously been included in the Liliales, and included three taxonomic groups: (i) Liliaceae sensu Dahlgren, but also both the (ii) Calochortaceae as defined by Minoro Tamura (sensu Tamura) and (iii) Clintonia-Medeola which had been included in Liliaceae sensu Tamura (see Table 3).

This newly, more narrowly (sensu stricto, s.s.) circumscribed Liliaceae, corresponded to the emerging circumscription of the family in the Angiosperm Phylogeny Group system (1998). While this also corresponded most closely with Dahlgren's circumscription relative to the older much broader (sensu lato, s.l.) constructions, it gave rise to some potentially confusing terminology. Compared to the very broad historical s.l. construction of Liliaceae, the Dahlgren, Tamura and APG constructions were much narrower. These have variously been referred to as "core Liliales" and sensu APG for the broadest construction, while the intervening schemes of Tamura and Takhtajan (who was also a "splitter") which are narrower have been referred to as Liliaceae s.s., sensu Dahlgren, and sensu Tamura. Of these the narrowest circumscription is that of Dahlgren, including only Lilieae s.l.. In modern terminology, while "core Liliales" represents Liliaceae sensu APG, Liliaceae sensu Tamura corresponds to Lilioideae s.l., and sensu Dahlgren with Lilieae s.l. or Lilioideae s.s.. Calochortoideae and Streptopoideae sensu APG represent and Calochortaceae sensu Tamura, and Clintonia plus Medeola (Medeoleae) Medeoloideae sensu Tamura (see Table 3).

Modern classification of Liliaceae 

To meet the need for a thorough revision of the taxonomy of the flowering plants (angiosperms), systematists formed the Angiosperm Phylogeny Group (APG), resulting in a new classification published in 1998. The scheme was largely based on the work of Kåre Bremer and colleagues at Uppsala and Stockholm universities in the late 1970s, and became universally accessible on the internet in 1996.
It was an ordinal system, concentrating on orders rather than families, prioritising monophyly, in which Liliales were recognised as one of ten monocot orders, containing nine families. However progress was rapid and the modern era of the taxonomy of the family Liliaceae comes from Judd and colleagues (2002), the APG II (2003) and APG III (2009), while the Linear APG III assigned it the family number 61. The original APG did not specifically address the issues of the polyphyly within Liliaceae, but APG II did so within the two closely morphologically related orders, Liliales and Asparagales recognising the continued common use of Liliaceae in the broad sense (sensu lato, s.l.).

These studies of DNA and morphological data (particularly reproductive morphology) together with phylogenetic analyses, allowed the conclusion that the "petaloid monocots" do not belong to one botanical family but rather are distributed across two separate orders, the Asparagales and Liliales. The monophyly of these newly defined orders is supported by cladistic analysis based on morphology, 18S rDNA, the plastid gene rbcL, and other DNA sequences.

These studies, together with other analyses within each of these two orders, allowed the redistribution of the original genera of Liliaceae s.l. into a variety of families across the Liliales and Asparagales, as illustrated in Cladogram 1. This redistribution resulted in considerable changes both in the suprafamilial positioning of Liliaceae within the overall APG classification (as shown in Table 1 below), as well as the subfamilial structure (see Suprageneric subdivisions).

Phylogeny 

The synthesis of molecular data with cladistic analysis suggests eleven orders of monocotyledons, one of fourteen clades of Angiosperms, and forming a grade with six other orders. Sequencing of the rbcL and trnL-F plastid genes revealed four main Liliales lineages:
 Liliaceae group: Liliaceae (including some former Uvulariaceae and Calochortaceae), Philesiaceae and Smilacaceae;
 Campynemataceae;
 Colchicaceae group (Colchicoid lilies): Colchicaceae (including Petermannia and Uvularia), Alstroemeriaceae and Luzuriaga;
 Melanthiaceae (including Trilliaceae).

The original family Liliaceae in the broad sense (sensu lato, s.l.), which encompassed a large number of differing groups of genera, was highly polyphyletic (see Cladogram 1). This led to botanists increasingly adopting a more narrow monophyletic concept, i.e. strict sense (sensu stricto, s.s.) of the family based on molecular phylogenetic relationships, as expressed in the 2009 APG III system, rather than the older sensu lato one. Former members of the Liliaceae are now principally classified in different families and subfamilies of the Liliales and Asparagales as shown in the phylogeny represented in Cladogram I. Other families and orders containing former Liliaceae taxa are the Nartheciaceae (Dioscoreales), Tofieldiaceae (Alismatales), Tecophilaeaceae (Asparagales) and the former Uvulariaceae. The achlorophyllous (non-photosynthesising) Corsiaceae were added to Liliales by APG III in 2009.

Sequencing of the rbcL and matK chloroplast genes of Lilium and related genera confirmed the circumscription of the family in the sensu stricto usage of Tamura (1998). Chloroplast ndhF gene sequencing also supported Liliaceae monophyly, reuniting the Liliaceae sensu Tamura and Calochortaceae sensu Tamura (see Table 2 & Table 3 below).

Evolution and biogeography 

The major diversification amongst the Angiosperms (flowering plants) can be dated to the end of the Early Cretaceous period which stretched from 146 to 100 million years ago (mya). The development of a phylogenetic approach to taxonomy, starting with Charles Bessey's The phylogenetic taxonomy of flowering plants (1915) suggested the Liliales formed some of the earliest monocots, with an estimated date of origin of 124 mya for the stem node (most recent common ancestor of the clade of interest and its sister clade) age and between 117 mya to 82 mya for the crown node (most recent common ancestor of the sampled species of the clade of interest) age. Molecular analysis suggests that the Liliaceae sensu APG ("core Liliales") were part of one of four early clades of Liliales, namely Campynemataceae, Melanthiaceae, Alstroemeriaceae + Luzuriagaceae + Colchicaceae and Smilacaceae + Liliaceae, dated to 68–65 mya (stem node) with the separation of the Smilaceae and Liliaceae sister clades (crown node) occurring later at around 55–52 mya. divergence within the Liliaceae appeared at about 36–34 mya, within Liliaceae sensu Tamura (Lilioideae s.l.) at 27 mya, Liliaceae sensu Dahlgren (Lilieae s.s. and Tulipeae) at 20 mya (Miocene).

Within the Liliaceae sensu Dahlgren there developed two main evolutionary subclades (see Cladogram II and Table 3). The first of these, characterised as the Lilieae s.s. (Lilium, Fritillaria, Nomocharis), Cardiocrinum), Notholirion) diverged around 12 mya. The second subclade was the Tulipeae (Erythronium, Tulipa), (Gagea). Divergence within Calochortus is dated to 7 mya. This places the emergence of the Liliaceae at approximately the last (Maastrichtian period) of the Late Cretaceous periods (72 to 66 mya) to early (Paleocene) Paleogene periods (66 to 23 mya), formerly the Cretaceous–Tertiary boundary, 65 mya.

The southern hemisphere intercontinental distributions of Liliales suggests a connection to Gondwana, whose breakup into western (Africa, South America) and eastern (Australia, Antarctica, Madagascar, India) portions occurred at 180–150 mya, and the final separation of the western portion into Africa and South America at 80 mya coinciding with the emergence of the Liliales. Thus the immediate ancestor of the Liliales is likely to have existed during the period of interconnection of the African and South American-Antarctic-Australian portions of Late Cretaceous Gondwana. While the ancestral clade appears to have been distributed in both northern and southern hemispheres, Liliaceae per se is holarctic, confined to the northern hemisphere with both Eurasian (including some North African representatives) and North American lineages. It is likely that they originated in North America but were able to expand to Eurasia ~30–40 mya via Beringia that connected the two during the Tertiary period. The presence of genera whIch are restricted to Eurasia suggests a vicariance (separation of populations by continental division) split between Medeoleae and Lilieae involving Eurasia and North America (Cladogram II).

Liliaceae sensu Dahlgren arose in Eurasia, while within Liliaceae sensu Dahlgren the Lilieae s.s. subclade arose in the Himalayas (Qinghai-Tibetan Plateau), with later radiation there in montane and alpine habitats. Species of Lilium and Fritillaria then dispersed into the rest of Eurasia and North America. The second subclade, the Tulipeae arose in East Asia with subsequent colonisation of North America by Erythronium and Lloydia. On the other hand, Clintonia-Medeola (Medeoleae) may have appeared in North America but subsequently underwent intercontinental dispersal (although some evidence points to a Eurasian origin). The Calochortaceae sensu Tamura (Streptopoideae and Calochortoideae) appears to have evolved in western North America, with subsequent colonisation of East Asia by Streptopus and the ancestral Tricyrtis.

Liliaceae probably arose as shade plants in closed shaded habitats, with subsequent evolution of Liliaceae sensu Dahlgren and Calochortus to open areas including deciduous forest in the more open autumnal period, but then a return of some species (e.g. Cardiocrinum). This was accompanied by a shift from rhizomes to bulbs, to more showy flowers, the production of capsular fruit and narrower parallel-veined leaves. Again, some reversal to the broader reticulate-veined leaves occurred (e.g. Cardiocrinum). In addition such molecular studies show that share characteristics do not necessarily indicate descent from a common ancestor but rather may arise from adaptive convergence in similar habitats. 

The fossil record of Liliales is relatively poor, but Liliaceae fossils have been dated to the Paleogene and Cretaceous periods in the Antarctic.

Characteristics

Liliaceae 

The diversity of characteristics complicates description of Liliaceae morphology, and confused taxonomic classification for centuries. The diversity is also of considerable evolutionary significance (see Evolution). The family Liliaceae are characterised as monocotyledonous, perennial, herbaceous, bulbous (or rhizomatous in the case of Medeoleae) flowering plants with simple trichomes (root hairs) and contractile roots. The flowers may be arranged along the stem, developing from the base, or as a single flower at the tip of the stem, or as a cluster of flowers. They contain both male (androecium) and female (gynoecium) characteristics and are symmetric radially, but sometimes as a mirror image. Most flowers are large and colourful, except for Medeoleae. Both the petals and sepals are usually similar and appear as two concentric groups (whorls) of "petals", that are often striped or multi-coloured, and produce nectar at their bases. The stamens are usually in two groups of three (trimerous) and the pollen has a single groove (monosulcate). The ovary is superior, i.e. placed above the attachment of the other parts. There are three fused carpels (syncarpous) with one to three chambers (locules), a single style and a three-lobed stigma. The embryo sac is of the Fritillaria type. The fruit is generally a wind-dispersed capsule, but occasionally a berry (Medeoleae) which is dispersed by animals. The leaves are generally simple and elongated with veins parallel to the edges, arranged singly and alternating on the stem, but may form a rosette at the base of the stem.

Subclades

(See Table 3). The ten genera (two genera of Table 3 are subsumed into other genera) of the subfamily Lilioideae are characterised by contractile bulbs and roots and a megagametophyte (embryo-sac) of the Fritillaria-type with four megaspores. Within the Lilioideae, the eight genera considered as Liliaceae by Dahlgren (sensu Dahlgren), that is Lilieae s.l., are characterised by loculicidal capsules and a basic chromosome number x=12. Within this clade, Lilieae s.s. are characterised by papillose tepals (with the exception of Fritillaria) and numerous fleshy bulb-scales as well as a morphologically distinct karyotype with two long metacentric chromosomes and 10 telocentrics of medium length. The two genera within Tulipeae are distinguished by pseudo-basifixed anthers and single bulb scales. The two genera of Medeoleae are distinguished by having rhizomes instead of bulbs and berries instead of capsules, and a very unusual form of vesicular-arbuscular mycorrhizae.

The five genera constituting the Streptopoideae and Calochortoideae subfamilies form another distinct group, previously characterised under the Calochortoideae alone. These have creeping rhizomes, styles divided at their apices, and an embryo-sac of the Polygonum-type with a simple megaspore and triploid endosperm. At times, these genera were considered as a separate family (Calochortaceae; e.g. Tamura) or even placed in the more heterogeneous Uvulariaceae sensu Dahlgren. However most of the latter had low morphological similarity to the Liliaceae, and Uvularia and Disporum are now classified in the Colchicaceae. Disporum  contained both Asian and North American species which had always been distinguishable. Following molecular analysis, the North American species were restored to the genus Prosartes and retained in Liliaceae, subfamily Streptopoideae, while the Asian species were moved to Colchicaceae.

Subdivisions

Suprageneric subdivisions 

Due to the diversity of the originally broadly defined Liliaceae (s.l.), many attempts have been made to form supageneric classification systems, organizing the genera into subfamilies, tribes, or other suprageneric taxa (taxonomic groupings between genus and family). By 1813, Candolle recognised five subdivisions which he called tribes (Asparagées, Trilliacées, Asphodelées, Bromeliées, Tulipacées), all of which Jussieu had made separate families, with the exception of Tulipa, which was a genus within the Liliaceae. By 1845, John Lindley observed that the family had become extremely diverse, ill-defined and unstable, not only by its overall circumscription, but also by its subdivisions. For the 133 genera he included, he described eleven suborders. By the 1870s, as Baker describes in his revision of the family, the taxonomy of Liliaceae had become vast and complicated. His approach was to divide the family into eight tribes.

In 1879, a revision of the North American Liliaceae by Sereno Watson described sixteen tribes, of which the Lilieae correspond most closely to current concepts of the family, Bentham and Hooker described twenty tribes in 1883, and Engler and Prantl in their extensive description of the Liliaceae in 1899 identified 31 tribes distributed over 11 subfamilies, with Tulipeae and Alieae representing the modern family. In 1936, Franz Buxbaum undertook a major revision of the Liliaceae and among others described the subfamily Lilioideae with three tribes: Lloydieae (Gagea, Lloydia and Szechenya and Giradiella — both now included in Lloydia), Tulipeae (Erythronium, Tulipa and Eduardoregalia — now part of Tulipa) and Lilieae (Korolkowia, Fritillaria, Notholirion, Cardiocrinum, Nomocharis and Lilium). Hutchinson included most of these genera within the tribe Tulipeae. The complex rearrangements of the various genera, tribes and subfamilies over a 30-year period from 1985, discussed by Peruzzi and colleagues (2009), are partly summarised in Table 2 below.

Classifications published since the use of molecular phylogenetics have taken a narrower view of the Liliaceae (s.s.). In 1998, Tamura considered Calochortus sufficiently distinct to elevate the subfamily Calochortoideae to family status as Calochortaceae, resulting in the term Liliaceae sensu Tamura to indicate Liliaceae without the Calochortoideae. In 2009, Takhtajan used an even narrower definition (see Table 2 & Table 3 below).

Despite now having established a taxonomic grouping for the family Liliaceae that is genetically monophyletic, compared to the prior longstanding polyphyletic assemblages under this name, the morphology remains diverse, and there exists within the Liliaceae clade a number of subclades. There appeared to be two major clades, the first and largest of these consisted of three subclades: Clintonia—Medeola—Gagea, Lilium Fritillaria—Notholirion, and Tulipa—Erythronium. The second smaller clade, Streptopus—Tricyrtis contained elements of Dahlgren's Uvulariaceae. The position of Calochortus remained problematic, being considered a sister clade to Liliaceae, as treated by Tamura, but further analysis suggested it was in fact sister to Tricyrtis, although it is now considered separate once again (see Table 3).

Also enigmatic were Clintonia, Medeola, Scoliopus, and Tricyrtis. Clintonia, with a disjunct distribution involving East Asia and North America, and the closely related Medeola form a subclades and are now considered a separate tribe (Medeoleae) within the Lilioideae, although at different times they have been considered a separate subfamily (Medeoloideae) or family (Medeolaceae). Sequencing of the rbcL and matK chloroplast genes established monophyly for Clintonia, but with separate clades corresponding to the two areas of distribution. The Angiosperm Phylogeny Website (APWeb) includes four of Takhtajan's families in Liliaceae, recognizing three subfamilies, one of which is divided into two tribes and referred to as Liliaceae sensu APG III.

Genera

Historical treatment 

Historically, the inclusion of genera within Liliaceae has been extremely broad. Of the various published systems, one of the best known and also the broadest modern circumscription is the Cronquist system (1981), which included nearly 300 genera in Liliaceae. Most of these have been reassigned to other families, as shown in the following collapsed list, following ITIS, together with their disposition as APG III transfers to other families and subfamilies, within Liliales and three other orders, Alismatales, Asparagales and Dioscoreales. Current members of Liliaceae are shown in bold.

The more modern phylogenetically based treatment of the genera, including the major systems of the 1980s of Dahlgren and Tamura, are shown in Table 3.

Modern subfamilial divisions within Liliaceae 
The evolutionary and phylogenetic relationships between the genera currently included in Liliaceae are shown in Cladogram III.

The largest genera are Gagea (200), Fritillaria (130), Lilium (110), and Tulipa (75 species), all within the tribe Lilieae. Various authorities (e.g. ITIS 16, GRIN 27, WCSP, NCBI, DELTA) differ on the exact number of genera included in Liliaceae s.s., but generally there are about fifteen to sixteen genera, depending on whether or not Amana is included in Tulipa and Lloydia in Gagea. For instance Amana is still listed separately in WCSP.

The exact subdivision of Liliaceae differs between authors. In 2002 Patterson and Givnish identified two major clades corresponding to Tamura's Calochortaceae and Liliaceae, but preferred to retain his original division into two separate families rather than the overarching "core Liliales" (Liliaceae sensu APG). Within Liliaceae sensu Tamura they confirmed his decision to include Medeola-Clintonia as a separate subfamily, Medeolioideae, with the remaining genera as subfamily Lilioideae. Liliodeae was then divided into two tribes, Lilieae and Tulipeae (Tulipa, Erythronium, Gagea, Lloydia). Within Calochortaceae sensu Tamura, they proposed erecting a second subfamily, Streptopoideae (Prosartes, Scoliopus, Streptopus), with the remaining genera in subfamily Calochortoideae. Subsequent work by Rønsted et al. (2005) and by Fay et al. (2006) confirmed the overall phylogenetic relationships of Patterson and Givnish and their subdivisions, and further elucidated the position of Gagea within the tribe Tulipae, but the latter authors restored the broader circumscription of Liliaceae sensu APG . In 2013, Kim et al. proposed further subdivision, placing the two genera of Calochortoideae (Calochortus and Tricyrtis) into subfamilies of their own and splitting off Gagea from the rest of Tulipeae by resurrecting the tribe Lloydieae. (see Table 3)

The best known schema, the APWeb, lists fifteen genera, arranged as follows, and illustrated in Table 4, with three subfamilies, Lilioideae representing Liliaceae sensu Tamura and the two subfamilies of Calochortaceae sensu Tamura (Streptopoideae and Calochortoideae) as proposed by Patterson and Givnish now included within Lilaceae sensu APG.

Etymology 
The name Liliaceae was coined by Michel Adanson in 1763. The name was derived from Lilium and the family suffix -aceae. Lilium is the type genus of the family, which is the Latin for Lily, which in turn came from the Greek name for it, λείριον (leírion).

See also 
 List of systems of plant taxonomy
 Phylogenetic nomenclature

Notes

References

Bibliography

Books

Paleobotany

Systematics and taxonomy 
  (7th ed. 2003 )
 
 
 
 
 
 
 
 
 
 
 
 
 
 
  excerpts

Taxonomic classifications (chronological)

 
 
 Table of 58 families, Part II: Page 1
 Table of 1615 genera, Part II: Page 8

Chapters 

  In .
 , In 
 , in 
  in 
 , in 
 , in 
  In 
  In 
  In 
  In .
  In 
  In . See also  for further excerpts
  In 
  in 
  In 
  In .
  In . Additional excerpts
  In

Articles

Phylogenetics

Phylogenetics: Angiosperms and monocots 

 
 
  In 
 
  In

Phylogenetics: Liliales

APG

Symposia 
 
 , see also excerpts in  
  Contents

Websites

Databases 

 
 , see also Angiosperm Phylogeny Website

External links 
 
 

.
Liliaceae